Malcolm Green may refer to:

Malcolm Green (chemist) (1936–2020), British professor of inorganic chemistry
Malcolm Green (musician) (born 1953), English drummer for New Zealand band Split Enz
Malcolm Green (physician), Vice-Principal, Faculty of Medicine, Imperial College